Ice Girl (lit. "That Girl Returned") is a 2005 South Korean television series starring Kim Hyo-jin, Kim Joo-seung, Kim Nam-jin and Seo Ji-hye. It aired on KBS2 from June 27 to August 16, 2005 on Mondays and Tuesdays at 21:55 for 16 episodes.

Plot
In 1980, Kim So-ryung suffers a heart attack right before her wedding to her fiancé, Jung Ha-rok. She is brought to her father's hospital to be treated, but her father, Dr. Kim, is unable to save her. He decides to freeze her body as he looks for other ways.

25 years later, she wakes from her frozen state but has no memories of her fiancé, and is given a new identity. After the death of her father from a car crash, she starts living with her ex-fiancé and soon falls in love with his son, Jung Min-jae.

Cast

Main characters
Kim Hyo-jin as Kim So-ryung
Kim Joo-seung as Jung Ha-rok
Park Jin-woo as young Ha-rok
Kim Nam-jin as Jung Min-jae
Seo Ji-hye as Cha Joo-ha

Supporting characters
Jung Wook as Dr. Kim Soo-yeop
Yoon So-jung as Dr. Oh Jung-hee
Moon Chun-sik as Supervisor Jo
Kwon Hyuk-go as President
Lee Dal-hyung as a supervisor
Park Soon-chun as Jung Soo-im

References

External links
 Ice Girl official KBS website 
 

Korean-language television shows
2005 South Korean television series debuts
2005 South Korean television series endings
Korean Broadcasting System television dramas
South Korean romance television series